Spanking Machine is the debut album by American punk rock band Babes in Toyland, released in 1990.

Background and production
The working title of the album was Swamp Pussy, which later ended up becoming the opening song on the album. The album title was later changed to Spanking Machine, after the "spanking machine" from an episode of Leave It to Beaver titled "The Price of Fame."

The album was recorded and produced by Seattle musician/producer Jack Endino at Reciprocal Recording in Seattle - where other bands such as Nirvana and Mudhoney recorded - and was released in April 1990 by Twin/Tone Records.

"Dust Cake Boy" was the first and only single from the album, released by Treehouse Records (Minneapolis) in 1989. It was recorded in 1988, before the band's sessions with Jack Endino, at Technisound Studio and produced by Brian Paulson. The single was backed with "Spit to See the Shine". A promotional video for the song "He's My Thing" was also recorded, though the song was never released as a single. Recorded during a live show at Minneapolis' First Avenue, the video was recorded on a 16mm camera by Mike Etoll.

Critical reception

Spanking Machine received generally positive reviews from critics, with Mark Deming of AllMusic stating:
[Spanking Machine] sounds like the blueprint for the music [Courtney] Love  would make during Hole's first incarnation [...] that Spanking Machine is a more compelling and emotionally powerful work [and] Kat Bjelland's songs pull no punches.

Other bands interested in the underground music scene - most notably Sonic Youth - were fans of the album, so much so that Sonic Youth's Thurston Moore invited the band to perform on Sonic Youth's 1990 European tour to promote their latest album, Goo. The band also performed alongside Sonic Youth at 1991's Reading Festival, which was documented by Dave Markey's music documentary, 1991: The Year Punk Broke.

Rolling Stone ranked Spanking Machine at #27 in their list of the 50 Greatest Grunge Albums in 2019, writing that Spanking Machine "was a perfect marriage of crunchy Midwestern punk and wry Northwestern malaise."

Track listing
All songs written by Kat Bjelland, except where noted

Musicians and personnel
Kat Bjelland - lead vocals, guitar
Lori Barbero - drums, backing vocals (lead vocals on "Dogg")
Michelle Leon - bass
Jack Endino - producer, engineer

References

1990 debut albums
Babes in Toyland (band) albums
Albums produced by Jack Endino
Twin/Tone Records albums